T5 or T-5 may refer to:

Biology and medicine
 Fifth thoracic vertebrae
 Fifth spinal nerve
 Bacteriophage T5, a bacteriophage
 T5: an EEG electrode site according to the 10-20 system

Vehicles and transportation
 AIDC T-5 Brave Eagle, a Taiwanese jet trainer aircraft.
 Ford T5, a Ford Mustang built for export to Germany
 Fuji T-5, a 1988 Japanese turboprop-driven primary trainer aircraft
 Volkswagen Transporter, a van
 a model of the OS T1000 train of the Oslo Metro
 Île-de-France tramway Line 5, one of the Tramways in Île-de-France
 Borg-Warner T-5 transmission
 T5 engine (disambiguation), a range of Volvo automobile engines
 Cumberland line, a service of Sydney Trains
 T5 (Istanbul Tram), a tram line in Istanbul, Turkey
T5 Road (Zambia), a road in Zambia
 Turkmenistan Airlines, IATA airline designator
 Terminal 5 at JFK Airport in New York City
 Heathrow Terminal 5

Pop culture
 Tele 5 (Poland), a TV channel
 Thunderbird 5, an episode in the Thunderbird TV series
 In topology, a completely normal and hausdorff space
 Telecinco, a Spanish TV channel
 The fifth edition of the role-playing game Traveller
 Tekken 5, a 2004 fighting game
 Terminator Genisys, Terminator 5, the fifth film in the Terminator film franchise

Other
 T5 fluorescent lamp
 T-5 torpedo, a Soviet torpedo with a nuclear warhead
 The Torx T5 (sometimes written T-5) or compatible screw drives
 Tungsten T5, a PDA
 Rebel T5, the model name used in the Americas for the Canon EOS 1200D digital camera
 Tapestry 5, a Java-based web application framework
 SPARC T5, a processor chip by the Sun division of Oracle, and also the servers built around it
 A tornado intensity rating on the TORRO scale